Senapathy is a Grama Panchayat village located in Nedumkandam Block Panchayat in Idukki district of Kerala, India.

See also
 Idukki

References

Villages in Idukki district